Frank Joseph Zupo (August 29, 1939 – March 25, 2005), nicknamed "Noodles", was an American professional baseball player. A catcher, he appeared in 16 games over parts of three seasons in Major League Baseball for the Baltimore Orioles in 1957–58 and 1961.

Biography
He signed with the Orioles for a $50,000 bonus after graduating from Sacred Heart Cathedral Preparatory, a private Roman Catholic high school in his native city.

In , Zupo entered the American League as a 17-year-old "bonus baby" without having played in the minor leagues; the bonus rule of the day mandated that MLB teams keep bonus players on their big-league rosters for two full years. That season, together with George Zuverink, Zupo twice formed the only "Z" battery in Major League history, the first time coming on July 1, 1957, when Zupo made his big-league debut with a 10th-inning catching appearance against the New York Yankees. He batted only 12 times in ten games in 1957, with one hit (.083).

In , the bonus rule was amended and Baltimore was able to send Zupo to the minors for needed experience. Recalled after spending that year at three different minor league levels, he appeared in one September game and went hitless in two at bats in relief of the Orioles' regular catcher, Gus Triandos. His other trial in the big leagues occurred early in the  campaign, and he collected two hits, including a double, in four at bats; it would be his only extra-base hit in the majors.

Zupo's career continued in the minor leagues through 1964 before he left the game.

References
.

External links

 https://web.archive.org/web/20070806023012/http://historicbaseball.com/players/z/zupo_frank.html

1939 births
2005 deaths
Asheville Tourists players
Austin Senators players
Baltimore Orioles players
Baseball players from San Francisco
Burials at Holy Cross Cemetery (Colma, California)
Dallas Rangers players
Knoxville Smokies players
Louisville Colonels (minor league) players
Major League Baseball catchers
Rochester Red Wings players
Salem Senators players
Stockton Ports players
Victoria Rosebuds players
Wilson Tobs players
Yakima Braves players
York White Roses players